The Niuheliang railway station is a railway station of Jingshen Passenger Railway that is located in Machang Village, Chengguan Subdistrict, Lingyuan, Chaoyang, Liaoning, People's Republic of China.

Railway stations in Liaoning
Stations on the Beijing–Harbin High-Speed Railway